Nangazizi is a settlement in the province of Haut-Uélé in the Democratic Republic of the Congo.

Location

Nangazizi is in the Azanga chiefdom of the Rungu Territory in Haut-Uélé.
Niangara is further to the north on the Uele River.
It is on the RP426 highway between Isiro to the southwest and Rungu to the north on the Bomokandi River.
The Köppen climate classification is "Aw": Tropical savanna, wet.

The Mangbetu language is spoken in Nangazizi and Rungu.

Historical

On 1 May 1872 the Italian explorer Giovanni Miani arrived at Nangazizi, the base of chief Mbunza, where he rested until 25 May 1872.
In the second half of November that year Miani's expedition returned to Nangazizi.
Miani died there on 21 November 1972 from a combination of fatigue, dysentery and necrosis of the arm.
He was buried there, but his tomb was soon dug up again by the local people.
Later Romolo Gessi managed to obtain the bones, which were given to the Italian Geographic Society.

Notes

Sources

Populated places in Haut-Uélé